Botsa Satyanarayana (9 July 1958), also spelled as Botcha Satyanarayana, is an Indian politician from Andhra Pradesh, India. He belonged to the Indian National Congress until 2015 and he joined the YSR Congress on 7 June 2015. He is a former cabinet minister for Municipal Administration and Urban Development in Andhra Pradesh.

Personal life
Botsa was born in Vizianagaram. He has studied Bachelor of Arts at Maharajah's College. He was married to Botsa Jhansi Lakshmi who was elected as a Lok Sabha representative from Bobbili constituency in 2006 and Vizianagaram constituency in 2009. He has a brother, Botsa Appala Narasaiah, who is also a politician.

Political career
Botsa Satyanarayana won the Bobbili parliamentary constituency in 1999 as an MP. Due to the NDA climate, the Indian National Congress party won only 5 MPs from Andhra Pradesh and Botsa was one of them. Botsa represented as MLA from Cheepurupalli Assembly constituency in 2004, 2009. Botsa served as Minister for Heavy Industries, Panchayati Raj, Housing, Transport and Marketing. He served as the president of Andhra Pradesh Congress Committee.

After Y. S. Rajasekhara Reddy's death due to helicopter crash in 2009, Konijeti Rosaiah, Nallari Kiran Kumar Reddy served as the chief ministers of Andhra Pradesh. At that time, Botsa's name also came up in the campaign as the chief ministerial candidate.

In 2015, Botsa resigned from the Indian National Congress party and joined the YSR Congress Party‌ along with his family and supporters. He represented third time MLA from Cheepurupalli constituency in 2019 and served as the Minister for Municipal Administration and Urban Development in the Government of Andhra Pradesh from 8 June 2019 to 7 April 2022.

See also
Botcha Appalanarasayya

References

External links 
 Botsa Satyanarayana profile
 Controversy re using public resources for daughter's wedding
 Women Shouldn't Roam the Streets at Night Just Because we Got Independence at Midnight

India MPs 1999–2004
Living people
Indian National Congress politicians from Andhra Pradesh
People from Vizianagaram
Lok Sabha members from Andhra Pradesh
People from Vizianagaram district
People from Uttarandhra
YSR Congress Party politicians
1958 births
Andhra Pradesh MLAs 2019–2024